Pacto de Sangue is a Brazilian crime drama television series created by Lucas Vivo and produced by Intro Pictures loosely based on the real-life story of Wallace Souza, a Brazilian TV personality from Amazonas, who was accused of ordering a series of murders to improve the ratings of his crime show.

The first season, of eight episodes, was shown on Space in Brazil from August 2018, and on Netflix in some countries from October 2018.

Plot 

Silas Campello is an ambitious and charismatic TV reporter who becomes a famous police program presenter and one of the most powerful names in the state of Pará. However, to achieve this fame he was able to go through the most devious paths. With the help of his brother Edinho, he maintains alliances with criminals where he ordered murders to be able to display them on television, further increasing his audience.

Cast and characters 
 Guilherme Fontes as Silas Campello
 Ravel Cabral	as	Roberto Moreira      
 André Ramiro	as	Soares      
 Jonathan Haagensen	as	Trucco      
 Adriano Garib	as	Edinho      
 Mel Lisboa	as	Gringa      
 Paulo Miklos	as	Mauro Caceres      
 Fúlvio Stefanini	as	Simão      
 Gracindo Júnior	as	Amaral      
 Cristina Lago	as	Renata      
 Mika Guluzian	as	Mari Campello      
 Sílvio Restiffe	as	Milton      
 Adriano Bolshi	as	Batista
 Daniel Torres	as	Sacerdote     
 Guilherme Rodio	as	Osmir

Episodes

References

External links
 

2018 Brazilian television series debuts
2010s Brazilian television series
Brazilian crime television series
Brazilian drama television series
Portuguese-language television shows
Television series based on actual events
Television shows set in Belém